This article charts the seedings and the results of the group stage of the 2007–08 UEFA Cup.

Seedings
The following teams qualified for the group stage:

Tie-breaking criteria
Based on paragraph 6.06 in the UEFA regulations for the current season, if two or more teams are equal on points on completion of the group matches, the following criteria are applied to determine the rankings:
superior goal difference from all group matches played;
higher number of goals scored;
higher number of goals scored away;
higher number of wins;
higher number of away wins;
higher number of coefficient points accumulated by the club in question, as well as its association, over the previous five seasons.

Groups

Group A

All times CET

Group B

All times CET

Group C

All times CET

Group D

All times CET

Group E

All times CET

Group F

All times CET

Group G

All times CET

Group H

All times CET

References

Group Stage
2007-08